Toni Dietl is a German karateka (7 Dan), non-fiction author and former national coach in the Deutscher Karate Verband. He is a multiple winner of Karate World Championship and European Karate Championships medals. He is also the founder of the Kampfkunst Kollegium

References 

1961 births
Living people
Sportspeople from Würzburg
German male karateka
Karate coaches
20th-century German people